Axel Beer (born 17 February 1956) is a German musicologist. He has been teaching at the Johannes Gutenberg University Mainz since 1995.

Born in Fulda, Beer studied musicology, Latin philology and auxiliary sciences of history at the Johann-Wolfgang-Goethe-Universität Frankfurt am Main (class 1987).

Publications 
 Die Annahme des "stile nuovo" in der katholischen Kirchenmusik Süddeutschlands, Tutzing, Schneider, 1989, 378 pages
 Heinrich Joseph Wassermann (1791-1838). Lebensweg und Schaffen. Ein Blick in das Musikleben des frühen 19. Jahrhunderts, Hamburg-Eisenach, Wagner, 1991, 256 pages
 (edited with Laurenz Lütteken) Festschrift Klaus Hortschansky zum 60. Geburtstag, Tutzing, Schneider 1995
 Musik zwischen Komponist, Verlag und Publikum. Die Rahmenbedingungen des Musikschaffens in Deutschland im ersten Drittel des 19. Jahrhunderts, Tutzing, Schneider, 2000, 561 pages
 Johann Franz Xaver Sterkel's Briefwechsel mit seinen Verlegern, Mainz, Schott, 2001, 138 pages; together with Dagmar Schnell
 "Empfehlenswerthe Musikalien". Besprechungen musikalischer Neuerscheinungen außerhalb der Fachpresse (Deutschland, 1. Hälfte des 19. Jahrhunderts). Eine Bibliographie, first part, Göttingen-London, Hainholz, 2000, 353 pages; Second part ebd. 2001, 353 pages
 "Die Oper daheim. Variationen als Rezeptionsform; Verzeichnis der Variationswerke über Themen aus Weigls Schweizer Familie". In Hans-Joachim Hinrichsen, Klaus Pietschmann (editors): Jenseits der Bühne. Bearbeitungs- und Rezeptionsformen der Oper im 19. und 20. Jahrhundert (Schweizer Beiträge zur Musikforschung; vol. 15). Bärenreiter-Verlag, Kassel 2011, .

References 

1956 births
Living people
People from Fulda
Academic staff of Johannes Gutenberg University Mainz
20th-century German musicologists
21st-century German musicologists